Sulcoplasty is an orthopedic surgical procedure performed on a groove (sulcus) or indentation present on particular bones. In veterinary surgery it is often employed to remedy a displaced kneecap ("patellar luxation") by deepening the trochlear sulcus, the groove on which the patella normally sits.

References

Orthopedic surgical procedures